Nelson Onono-Onweng was an Anglican bishop in Uganda: he was the  Bishop of Northern Uganda until his retirement in 2009.

References

Anglican bishops of Northern Uganda
21st-century Anglican bishops in Uganda
Living people
Uganda Christian University alumni
Year of birth missing (living people)